

Portugal
 Angola – Rodrigo César de Meneses, Governor of Angola (1733–1738)
 Macau – Antonio de Amaral Meneses, Governor of Macau (1732–1735)

Colonial governors
Colonial governors
1734